Syed Imtiaz Ahmed (27 April 1954 – 14 February 2020) was an Indian cricketer. He played in thirteen first-class matches for Karnataka from 1973 to 1980.

References

External links
 

1954 births
2020 deaths
Indian cricketers
Karnataka cricketers
Place of birth missing